Keller Rinaudo Cliffton is an American robotics and autonomous airplane entrepreneur and the CEO and a co-founder of Zipline.

Zipline began drone deliveries in Rwanda in late 2016, and primarily delivers blood to urgent medical situations. 

He was also the CEO and a co-founder of Romotive, a former company established in 2011 with Kickstarter funding that made inexpensive small robots that use mobile phones as their computing system, machine vision system, and wireless communication system. Romotive essentially shut down in 2014 and morphed into Zipline. Rinaudo Cliffton presented a TED Talk about Romotive in April 2013 and another in November 2017 about Zipline.

Education

Early education 
Rinaudo Cliffton attended North High School in Phoenix Arizona, receiving an IB diploma and being named a National Merit Scholar.

College and internships 
Rinaudo Cliffton is a graduate of Harvard University, where he was the founder of the Harvard climbing wall.  The wall was initially founded by Rinaudo Cliffton with help from Harvard Business School student Karl R. R. Kuryla as a relatively primitive construction in Lowell House in 2006, and was later upgraded and reopened in the Quadrangle Recreational Athletic Center in 2017.

While a student, Rinaudo Cliffton built computers out of RNA and DNA that he said could operate in human cells as "molecular doctors". He published this research in Nature Biotechnology, becoming one of the youngest first authors in that publication's history.

Rinaudo Cliffton graduated from Harvard magna cum laude and Phi Beta Kappa with a 3.9 GPA and was designated a Harvard College Scholar for superior academic achievement both freshman and second years and also won the Detur Book Prize (top 5% of the class).

While in his undergrad at Harvard, Rinaudo Cliffton spent several summers (2006–2008) working at the management consulting firm, Boston Consulting Group (BCG). He signed a full-time offer at BCG following his junior year internship to return to the firm following graduation (for fall of 2009). During his time at BCG, Rinaudo Cliffton "Conducted in-depth financial analysis of 140 competitors in the engineering construction industry and co-wrote new international strategy for a US company with $8B in revenue."

MBA 
In his senior year at Harvard, Rinaudo Cliffton was also admitted into Harvard Business School (HBS) for the class of 2013 - through the 2+2 program. However, Rinaudo Cliffton ultimately chose not to attend HBS due to the success of Romotive.

Early career 
Following his graduation from Harvard, Rinaudo Cliffton spent 2.5 months at BCG in their San Francisco office before quitting to live out of his van and become a professional rock climber.

Rinaudo Cliffton grew up rock climbing and quickly found professional success in the sport. As a professional rock climber he was ranked in the top 10 in sport climbing. He has scaled alpine cliffs in France, underwater caves in Kentucky and the limestone towers of Yangshuo, China.

Rinaudo Cliffton founded JobSpice through the business accelerator Y Combinator in the fall of 2009.

Romotive

In 2011, Rinaudo Cliffton founded Romotive, an iPhone-controlled toy robot. Rinaudo Cliffton sold the first version through Kickstarter. Romotive morphed into Zipline in 2014 when Rinaudo Cliffton realized that the competition was not other toys but Minecraft and phone apps. "If we’d compared ourselves to true competition-- competition for a 12-year-old's time-- this is not a battle that robotics was going to win."

Zipline  
Rinaudo Cliffton is the CEO and Co-founder of Zipline, an American medical product delivery company headquartered in South San Francisco, California, that designs, builds, and operates drone aircraft. The company operates distribution centers in Rwanda and Ghana. The company began drone deliveries in Rwanda in 2016 and primarily delivers blood. In addition to whole blood, the drones deliver platelets, frozen plasma and cryoprecipitate. As of May 2019, more than 65% of blood deliveries in Rwanda outside of the capital city Kigali use Zipline drones.

In Ghana, the company began using drones in April 2019 to deliver vaccines, blood, and drugs.

During the COVID-19 pandemic in 2020, the US Federal Aviation Administration approved Zipline for the delivery of medical supplies and personal protective equipment to hospitals in North Carolina. The company also plans to offer deliveries to people's homes.

Personal Life  

Keller is the son of William (Bill) Phillips and Debra Rinaudo. He is married to Stephanie Nevins Cliffton, PhD, who got her PhD at Stanford in Genetics/Genomics. Nevins Clifton is the founder and CEO of a stealth startup. Keller and Stephanie have one daughter together.

References 

21st-century American businesspeople
1987 births
Living people
American aerospace businesspeople
American chairpersons of corporations
American technology company founders
American technology chief executives
Harvard University alumni